Udaya Chandrika, better known by her screen/stage name Radha (born 3 June 1965), is an Indian actress, who predominantly appears in Tamil and Telugu films in addition to a few Malayalam, Kannada and Hindi films. She was one of the top heroines in the film industry for about a decade; from 1981 to 1991 (dominating the 80s era).

Her elder sister Ambika, was also an actress. Ambika and Radha acted together in a number of films, during the peak of their careers. They also co-owned a movie studio called "ARS Studios" in 1986.  She appeared on television as one of the judges in the STAR Vijay Jodi Number One Season 7 and 8 Reality Dance program.

Personal life
Radha hails from Kallara Village near Kilimanoor in  a at Thiruvananthapuram District in Kerala. She was born as Udaya Chandrika on 3 June 1965 and is the third daughter of Karunakaran Nair and Sarassama. Her siblings are Ambika, Mallika, Suresh and Arjun. Her elder sister Ambika is also a popular actor of the Indian Silver Screen. The two sisters dominated the '80s and were an unavoidable factor in the South Indian film industry at the time.

Radha married hotelier Rajasekaran Nair on 10 September 1991. The couple has two daughters Karthika Nair, Thulasi Nair and one son Vignesh Nair. After her marriage in 1991, Radha chose to completely step away from the limelight of acting as she had already  established herself as a superstar throughout the 80s era through her abundant work displayed in just a short span. Radha introduced her daughters Karthika Nair and Thulasi Nair. But both of them didn't have much interest in acting. When many fans requested Radha to do movies, she stated that she didn't have time to play in the movies further as Radha had been managing her business in Chennai, Kerala & Mumbai. 

In 2021, Radha along with husband Rajasekaran Nair joined Bharatiya Janata Party. Rajasekaran Nair is the party's candidate from Neyyatinkara constituency for the 2021 Kerala Legislative Assembly election. Radha is otherwise active on social media, such as IG (Instagram) and others. She has also been involved with T.V shows as a judge for the following: 

Jodi Number One season 6
Jodi Number One season 7
Jodi Number One season 8
Jodi Number One season 9
Kalakka Povathu Yaru Season 8
Kodeeswari (Guest)
Super Queen
BB Jodi (Telugu as judge)

Career

Tamil cinema
Radha started her career in 1981 starring as the protagonist in director Bharathiraja's Tamil film Alaigal Oivathillai alongside debutant Karthik. The movie was a runaway hit and is regarded as a cult classic. The on-screen chemistry that she shared with Karthik was highly successful and led to many movies such as Ilanjodigal,  Pakkathu Veetu Roja, Valibamey Vaa Vaa and Nalla Thambi. Radha played a small role in the movie Tik Tik Tik, which also starred legendary Tamil actor Kamal Haasan. Tik Tik Tik played a significant role in her career. Later, she starred alongside Haasan in many movies such as Thoongadhey Thambi Thoongadhey (1983), Oru Kaidhiyin Diary (1985), Japanil Kalyanaraman (1985) and Kadhal Parisu (1987).

She received a Filmfare Award for Best Actress – Tamil in Muthal Mariyathai in 1985 .At the 33rd National Film Awards, Radha was a strong contender for the Best Actress category, but was disqualified since her voice was dubbed by a different actress. The film was screened at the Indian Panorama section of the 1985 International Film Festival of India.

Ambika and Radha shared screen space in films such as Enkeyo Ketta Kural (1982), Vellai Roja (1983), Idaya Kovil (1985), Manakanakku (1986), Kadhal Parisu (1987) and Annanagar Mudhal Theru (1988). The two sisters were at the zenith of their fame when they acted in Kadhal Parisu, in which they played the roles of very glamorous, highly desirable women. Ambika and Radha managed their careers very carefully, and after attaining considerable success, they were very selective about taking up roles in Tamil movies and only performed with top actors and directors. It was very rare to see both the sisters in the same movie after their early years in the Tamil film industry.

She also had commercial successes such as Amman Kovil Kizhakale (1986), Mella Thirandhathu Kadhavu (1986), Ninaive Oru Sangeetham (1987), Jallikattu (1987), Sattam Oru Vilayaattu (1987), Uzhavan Magan (1987) and Rajadhi Raja (1989). In Kollywood, she has performed alongside several top heroes such as Sivaji Ganeshan, Sivakumar, Rajinikanth, Kamal Haasan, K. Bhagyaraj, Vijayakanth, Sathyaraj, Mohan, Prabhu, Karthik, T. Rajendar and Arjun.

Telugu cinema
Her notable films in Telugu include Shakthi (1983), Iddaru Dongalu (1984), Agni Parvatam (1985), Palnati Simham (1985), Ravana Brahma (1986), Simhasanam (1986), Yamudiki Mogudu (1988), Ramudu Bheemudu (1988) and State Rowdy (1989). She acted in 19 films alongside superstar Krishna, 16 films with Chiranjeevi, 6 films with Balakrishna and worked with all major Telugu heroes such as NTR, ANR, Krishnam Raju, Sobhan Babu and many more.

Kannada cinema
She has acted in 6 Kannada films. She acted alongside veteran Vishnuvardhan and actress Lakshmi in Sowbhagya Lakshmi (1986), a remake of the Hindi film Maang Bharo Sajana, which in turn was a remake of a Telugu movie Kartika Deepam. She has done films with Ravichandran. In 1991, she did the action movie Ranachandi (1991) in which she played a cop with Sarath Babu as her husband and Mukhyamantri Chandru as the villain. A massive hit in Kannada, it is still remembered by Kannada movie-goers.

Malayalam cinema
Though hailing from Kerala, she did not enjoy much success in Malayalam, unlike her sister Ambika (who had an equally successful career in Tamil, Kannada and Malayalam language films). She has acted only in six Malayalam films. Her most notable role was in K. G. George's state award-winning film Irakal in 1985; her portrayal of the character Nirmala is widely regarded as the best in her career. Her other significant role was in Sathyan Anthikad's Revathikkoru Pavakkutty (1986), where her costars were Bharat Gopy, Mohanlal and Menaka. She also produced a film Ayitham (1987), in which she played one of the lead characters, alongside Ambika (actress), Sukumaran and Mohanlal. Innathe Program (1991) was her last movie in Malayalam, which was also a hit.

Filmography

Tamil films

Telugu films

Malayalam films

Kannada films

Hindi films

Television
As Judge
Jodi Number One season 6
Jodi Number One season 7
Jodi Number One season 8
Jodi Number One season 9
Kalakka Povathu Yaru Season 8
Kodeeswari (Guest)
Super Queen
BB Jodi ( Telugu )

References

External links

1965 births
Living people
Actresses from Thiruvananthapuram
Actresses in Tamil cinema
Actresses in Telugu cinema
Indian film actresses
Actresses in Malayalam cinema
Tamil Nadu State Film Awards winners
Filmfare Awards South winners
Actresses in Kannada cinema
Actresses in Hindi cinema
20th-century Indian actresses